Vasilis Politis (born May 20, 1963) is a Greek philosopher and  Associate Professor of Philosophy at Trinity College Dublin. He is known for his expertise on Plato and Aristotle.
Politis is a Fellow of the Wissenschaftskolleg zu Berlin (2009–10) and Trinity College Dublin (2005) and director of the Dublin Centre for the Study of the Platonic Tradition.

Books
 The Structure of Enquiry in Plato’s Early Dialogues, CUP 2015
 Aristotle and the Metaphysics, Routledge 2004

Edited
 The Aporetic Tradition in Ancient Philosophy, co-edited with George Karamanolis, CUP 2016
 Kant’s Critique of Pure Reason, Everyman 1993

References

External links
 Vasilis Politis at Trinity College Dublin

Greek philosophers
Kant scholars
Philosophy academics
Living people
1963 births
Academics of Trinity College Dublin
Alumni of the University of Oxford
Metaphysicians
People from Athens
Scholars of ancient Greek philosophy